Pranchiyettan & the Saint is a 2010 Indian Malayalam-language satirical comedy film written, directed, and produced by Ranjith. The film centres on the fictitious conversation between the Thrissur based businessman C. E. Francis a.k.a. Pranchiyettan (Mammootty) and St. Francis of Assisi (Jesse Fox Allen). Priyamani, Innocent, Siddique, Khushbu Sundar, Jagathy Sreekumar, Ganapathy, Sasi Kalinga, Tini Tom and Biju Menon play the other important roles. The film is considered one of the best comedy films in Malayalam cinema and has attained cult status in the years following its release. Some critics consider the film as one of the defining movies of the Malayalam New Wave.

Plot

Chirammal Enashu Francis, a.k.a. Pranchiyettan, is a successful businessman based in Thrissur. He is a devotee of Saint Francis of Assisi and often has imaginary conversations with the saint. His ancestors were rice traders, but he has grown beyond the small rice shop to expand his business into jewellery, real estate, finance, shopping malls and lot more. Even though he is successful and wealthy, he is not well-educated. (He has not cleared the SSLC exams), He is unhappy with his name and also wants to become a celebrity. He is called Ari ("rice") Pranchi by everybody, citing his ancestors' business as a colloquial taunt. He wants to change his image from Ari Pranchi to something great and is ready to spend a fortune for it. The film deals with how Pranchi tries to get a good name and what changes that brings to his life.

The story starts with Francis talking to Saint Francis of Assisi about his own life. It starts with a short flashback about a quarrel between Francis and Jose over their lady love Omana when they were in school. Francis had a romance going with Omana but he had to give her up because of Jose's tricks. Now Jose and Omana are apparently happily married and are leading doctors in the city.

The story progresses with several anecdotes about Francis' attempts to get a good name for himself. These attempts are always told to him by his friend Vasu Menon, who always takes him to problems. He fights a local club election for the place of the club's president but is defeated by Jose. He then arranges a felicitation for the Oscar award-winner Gafoor Chekutty (a spoof of Resul Pookutty), but has to be satisfied with only a back row seat as he had to give up his seat on the dais for a Padmashree recipient. Inspired by the recognition and respect given to a Padmashree recipient, he decides to somehow grab such an award as that may help in changing his name from Ari Pranchi to Padmashree Pranchi. He bribes a politician named Ajay Nambiar with 15 million to get the award, but the corrupt politician dupes him.

Dejected, he withdraws into his house when a young woman named Padmashree comes from Mumbai to invite him for an inauguration ceremony. Following an initial altercation with her due to his misunderstanding of her intention, both become good friends and eventually, Francis falls in love with her. He also helps to prevent her tharavadu (ancestral home) from being sold off. However, he is unable to express his love for her and she returns to Mumbai.

During an interaction with his friend Antony, who is the principal of the local school, he narrates his woe to Francis. He fears that he might not be able to retire with the satisfaction of having presided over a school that got a pass rate of 100% in the SSLC exams. Moved, Francis resolves to help him. He quickly learns that the problem lies with a sole student named Pauly K. J., who always fails in the exams. Pauly's father says they are not financially sound and hence cannot help him enough with his studies. So, he brings the boy to his home and arranges for a special tutor, Pandit Deenadayal, to teach him. Deenadayal discovers that the boy is smart and immensely intelligent, but something is holding him back. He tries to teach Pauly to the best of his ability but, the boy's wit proves too much for him.

Pauly fails the exam again. Furious, Francis throws him out of his house. Upon learning that Pauly's parents were just his foster parents, he and Pauly go to see Pauly's biological father, Joppan, who is in prison serving a life sentence. Francis learns that Joppan, under the influence of alcohol and drugs, hacked his wife (Pauly's mother) and Pauly's teacher to death in front of Pauly. Francis concludes that this incident psychologically scarred the boy, which caused his academic performance to tank. The jail warden (Chaali Pala) discloses to Francis that Joppan is suffering from terminal liver cancer, and he deliberately hides it from the boy so as to not cause him further distress.

Francis then goes to the church in his car. While Pauly sleeps in the car, he talks to Saint Francis. He asks for the Saint's permission for him to adopt Pauly. Fearing failure, he asks the Saint to permit him only if he will succeed. The Saint then shows Francis 3 visuals. The first shows his lost love Omana and Jose cheating on each other. In the second, Ajay Nambiar, the man who cheated him by offering the Padmashree for a bribe is arrested by the police. In the third, Padmashree openly admits her love for Francis to her friend in Mumbai, and further discloses that she is going to propose to him. The Saint then tells him that what one sees as a success is not always a success and what one has lost can always come back to him in the future. Happy, Francis asks the Saint to bless Pauly. But when he returns with the boy, they find the place empty. An incredulous Pauly dismisses Francis' encounter with the Saint as make believe, but when Francis avers that he asked for and got the Saint's permission to adopt Pauly, he says that he too has seen the saint in human form, as Francis. The film concludes with father and son vowing to clear the SSLC exams together the coming year.

Cast

Production
The film was announced in June 2010. The film is produced by Renjith, under the banner of his Capitol Theatres. Shooting began on 1 July 2010.

The cast includes Mammootty, he plays the role of Chirammal Enashu Francis, a rice merchant in Thrissur. Hafis Firosh plays Mammootty's childhood counterpart. Innocent plays the role of Vasu Menon, friend of Pranchiyettan. Australian theatre artist Jesse Fox Allen played the role of the Saint. Apart from cine-artistes, this film also features many faces from the professional drama world, as in Renjith's Paleri Manikyam. Jagathy Sreekumar plays Deena Dayal. "My character is there only in a few scenes but he makes a definite impact, which is quite exciting for an actor. He is an idealistic teacher, who lives as per Gandhian principles and leads a simple life," says Jagathy Sreekumar. Master Ganapathy, who plays Pauly, says, "It is indeed great to be doing such a nice role with some of the big names in the industry. My character is a live wire."

Music
The score and the only song of the film were composed by Ouseppachan; the lyrics were penned by Shibu Chakravarthy. The music by Ouseppachan was "among the highlights of the film", according to one reviewer. However, the only song featured in the film, "Kinavile", generated mixed responses. It was sung by Gayatri, with male backing vocals provided by Ouseppachan himself. The soundtrack also features a male version of the song "Kinavile", which was sung by Franco. This version was not picturised and was not featured in the film. The soundtrack was released on Mathrubhumi Music.

Reception

Box office
The film was commercial success. It ran for more than 200 days in a theatre in Kerala. The film collected 957 from UK box office. It was made on a budget of 1.50 crore The film ran for 63 days in Oman box office, which is the longest running Malayalam film till date in Oman box office.

Critical response
Rediff's reviewer rated the film 5 out of 5 and said, "Pranchiyettan and the Saint is impressive... the success of [the film] rests on the shoulders of writer director Ranjith who gives a meaty story to actors to dig their teeth into." The performance by Mammootty as well as the supporting cast also earned appreciation from critics. The review on Rediff said, "The film depends heavily on Mammootty's histrionic skills to be convincing and it works. It is this effortless and natural performance that gives Pranchiyettan [its] lifeblood." Nowrunning comments: "Very few films are complex and comic at the same time, but Pranchiyettan achieves this almost impossible feat by employing clever plot devices, a fresh narrative structure and a string of metaphoric scenarios." The review praises Ranjith's work, saying, "There shouldn't be any trouble enthroning Ranjith as the harbinger of change in Malayalam cinema". Sify called the film "Very Good" and rated it 4 out of 5. Their review focused mainly on the apt usage of Thrissur slang by Mammootty.

Accolades
Amrita-FEFKA Film Awards
 Best Actor – Mammootty

 Asianet Film Awards
 Best Film – Pranchiyettan & the Saint
 Best Actor – Mammootty
 Best Cinematographer – Venu

 Asiavision Awards
 Best Film – Pranchiyettan & the Saint
 Best Actor – Mammootty
 Best Supporting Actor – Siddique
 Outstanding Performance – Innocent

 Filmfare Awards
 Best Film – Pranchiyettan & the Saint (Won)
 Best Director – Ranjith (Won)
 Best Actor – Mammootty (Won)
 Best Actress – Priyamani (Nominated)

Inspire Film Awards

 Best Film – Pranchiyettan & the Saint
 Best Actor – Mammootty
 Best Script – Ranjith

Kerala State Film Awards
 Kerala State Film Award for Best Film with Popular Appeal and Aesthetic Value- Ranjith

 Kerala Film Critics Awards

 Best Film – Pranchiyettan & the Saint
 Best Actor – Mammootty
 Best Script – Ranjith
 Best Director – Ranjith

 Vanitha Film Awards
 Best Film – Pranchiyettan & the Saint
 Best Actor – Mammootty
 Best Director – Ranjith
 Best Script – Ranjith
 Best Cinematography – Venu

 Vellinakshatram Film Awards
 Best Film – Pranchiyettan & the Saint
 Best Actor – Mammootty
 Best Director – Ranjith

References

External links
 

2010 films
2010s Malayalam-language films
Films shot in Thrissur
Indian satirical films
2010 comedy films
Films directed by Ranjith
Films scored by Ouseppachan